Voyage was a French disco and pop group, consisting of André "Slim" Pezin (guitar/vocals), Marc Chantereau (keyboards/vocals), Pierre-Alain Dahan (drums/vocals) and Sauveur Mallia (bass), together with British lead vocalist Sylvia Mason-James, who sang on the group's first two albums, Voyage (1977) and Fly Away (1978).

For their next two albums, Pierre-Alain Dahan became the lead vocalist on Voyage 3 (1980) and on One Step Higher (1982), and the group's sound changed from disco to pop.

Overview
Before Voyage, Pezin, Chantereau, Dahan and Mallia worked together in a band called V.I.P. Connection in 1975 with two disco songs: "Please Love Me Again" and "West Coast Drive", songs known by fans and collectors of early disco music.

They also worked as session musicians or in live performance in France, with artists such as: Manu Dibango, Cerrone, Alec R. Costandinos & the Synchophonic Orchestra, Michel Sardou for Slim Pezin; Michel Legrand, Jean Musy, Bernard Lavilliers for Sauveur Mallia; Léo Ferré, Michel Delpech, Guy Béart or Johnny Hallyday for Marc Chantereau; Nino Ferrer, Jean-Claude Petit and Stéphane Grappelli.

From the late 1960s until the mid 1970s, they were in demand in France, Europe and worldwide, in all styles of music: jazz with Grappelli, French chanson with Ferré, world music and jazz with Dibango, rock with Hallyday, and French pop with Sardou and Delpech.

Their lone Billboard Hot 100 entry was "Souvenirs," which hit No. 41 in 1979. They had more success on the U.S. Hot Dance Club Play chart, where two of their albums, Voyage (1978) and Fly Away (1979), hit number one.

In the UK, the group had three chart singles. A double A-side, "From East To West"/"Scotch Machine" (the latter song retitled "Scots Machine" because the term "Scotch" is no longer used in Scotland) reached No. 13 in 1978, while later that year "Souvenirs" made No. 56. Also popular was the song "Lady America". Their last impact on the charts came in 1979 when "Let's Fly Away" peaked at number thirty-eight.

In their home country, France, they were successful in the nightclubs of Paris, and featured on radio and television promoting their songs, but they ranked only three singles, "From East To West" peaked at #20 on May 26, 1978, then "Souvenirs" peaked at No. 53 on January 12, 1979, and "Tahiti - Tahiti" peaked at No. 43 on May 5, 1979. However, the four musicians couldn't replicate their successful French record sales in the United States. The songs "I Don't Want To Fall In Love Again" in 1980 and "Let's Get Started" in 1982 failed to chart. As disco waned, they turned to making albums with a more mainstream pop sound.

After Voyage, the group members worked separately with a number of singers, including Françoise Hardy, Alain Chamfort, Mylène Farmer, Guesch Patti, Jean-Louis Murat. Pezin worked on the French movie soundtrack Betty Blue in 1986 and produced a French hit "Caressé Mwen" sung by Marijosé Alie in 1987. Sauveur Mallia worked on several movies soundtracks like Moonstruck with Cher in 1987, Breakfast of Champions with Bruce Willis in 1999, and was involved in other projects with Chantereau and Dahan.

Discography

Studio albums

Compilation albums
The Best of Voyage (1989, Unidisc Music)
The Best of Voyage: "Souvenirs" (1991, Sirocco/Hot Productions)

Singles

See also
 List of artists who reached number one on the US Dance chart
 List of number-one dance hits (United States)

References

External links
 

Eurodisco groups
French dance music groups
French disco groups